Tony Day (born 14 April 1965) is a British swimmer. Day competed in two events at the 1988 Summer Olympics. He won the 1984 and 1988 ASA British National 1500 metres freestyle title.

References

External links
 

1965 births
Living people
British male swimmers
Olympic swimmers of Great Britain
Swimmers at the 1988 Summer Olympics
Sportspeople from St Asaph
Universiade bronze medalists for Great Britain
Medalists at the 1985 Summer Universiade
Universiade medalists in swimming